AVP: Evolution (full title: Alien vs. Predator: Evolution) is a third-person shooter tie-in to the Alien franchise, developed by Angry Mob Games and published by Fox Digital Entertainment for iOS, Android, and Ouya in 2013. It was later discontinued due to poor sales.

Reception

The iOS version received "mixed" reviews according to the review aggregation website Metacritic.

References

External links
 

2013 video games
Alien vs. Predator (franchise) games
Android (operating system) games
IOS games
Ouya games
Third-person shooters
Video games developed in Romania
Single-player video games